A postinfectious cough is a lingering cough that follows a respiratory tract infection, such as a common cold or flu and lasting up to eight weeks.  Postinfectious cough is a clinically recognized condition represented within the medical literature. Patients usually experience repeated episodes of postinfectious cough. The heightened sensitivity in the respiratory tract is demonstrated by inhalation cough challenge.

Cause
One possible cause for postinfectious cough is that the receptors that are responsible for stimulating the cough during the respiratory tract infection are up-regulated by respiratory tract infection and continue to stimulate even after the virus has disappeared.

Treatment
Postinfectious cough can be resistant to treatment, and usually goes away on its own; however, cough suppressants containing codeine may be prescribed.

See also
Asthma
Bronchiolitis
Cough medicine
Globus pharyngis

References

Symptoms and signs: Respiratory system